Amy Hayes (born November 24, 1973) is an American ring announcer and model. She is a regular on Fox Sports Net. and a former regular on ESPN2's Friday Night Fights, Hayes has also announced on United States, ESPN, and Showtime. She has also been featured on Best Damn Sports Show Period. She became the exclusive Ring Announcer on Fox Sport's networks  "Sunday Night Fights" series  - under Promoter Dan Goossen, in 2001. Hayes was asked to announce the very first episode of ShoBox: The New Generation on Showtime.

Career
In 2001, Hayes signed a five-year deal with Fox Sports News to do ring announcing.

References

1973 births
Living people
Boxing people
Female models from Michigan
American sports announcers
People from Wyandotte, Michigan
21st-century American women